"One in a Million" is a 1992 song recorded by the Australian dance-pop act Euphoria. The track was released on 19 April 1992 and later appeared on their debut album, Total Euphoria. The song became the group's second single to reach number one on the Australian ARIA Singles Chart.

Track listing
Australian CD single
 "One in a Million" (7-inch radio edit) (3:53) 
 "One in a Million" (12-inch mix) (5:53) 
 "One in a Million" (dub mix) (3:54)

Charts

Weekly charts

Year-end charts

Certification

References

External links
Official video
Live version of "One In a Million" from The Steve Vizard Show

1992 singles
1992 songs
EMI Records singles
Euphoria (Australian band) songs
Eurodance songs
Number-one singles in Australia
Songs written by Andrew Klippel